Philotheca langei is a species of flowering plant in the family Rutaceae and is endemic to a restricted area of the south-west of Western Australia. It is a small shrub with club-shaped, glandular-warty leaves and white flowers arranged singly or in twos or threes on the ends of branchlets.

Description
The ten stamens are free from each other and have a prominent white appendage on the anthers.

Taxonomy and naming
Philotheca langei was first formally described in 1993 by Frans Hendricus Mollemans in the journal Nuytsia from specimens he collected in the Chiddarcooping Hill Nature Reserve. The specific epithet (langei) honours the botanist Robert T. Lange.

Distribution and habitat
This philotheca grows in yellow sand near granite near Chiddarcooping Hill with one collection from near Merredin.

Conservation status
This philotheca is classified as "Priority One" by the Government of Western Australia Department of Parks and Wildlife, meaning that it is known from only one or a few locations which are potentially at risk.

References

langei
Flora of Western Australia
Sapindales of Australia
Plants described in 1993